The secretary of state for Wales, also referred to as the Welsh secretary, is a secretary of state in the Government of the United Kingdom, with responsibility for the Wales Office. The incumbent is a member of the Cabinet of the United Kingdom.

The officeholder works alongside the other Wales Office ministers. The corresponding shadow minister is the shadow secretary of state for Wales. The position is currently held by David Davies having being appointed by Rishi Sunak in October 2022.

Creation
In the first half of the 20th century, a number of politicians had supported the creation of the post of Secretary of State for Wales as a step towards home rule for Wales.  A post of Minister of Welsh Affairs was created in 1951 under the home secretary and was upgraded to minister of state level in 1954.

The Labour Party proposed the creation of a Welsh Office run by a Secretary of State for Wales in their manifesto for the 1959 general election. When they came to power in 1964 this was soon put into effect.

The post of Secretary of State for Wales came into existence on 17 October 1964; the first incumbent was Jim Griffiths, MP for Llanelli. The position entailed responsibility for Wales, and expenditure on certain public services was delegated from Westminster. In April 1965 administration of Welsh affairs, which had previously been divided between a number of government departments, was united in a newly created Welsh Office with the secretary of state for Wales at its head, and the Welsh secretary became responsible for education and training, health, trade and industry, environment, transport and agriculture within Wales.

History
During the 1980s and 1990s, as the number of Conservative MPs for Welsh constituencies dwindled almost to zero, the office fell into disrepute. Nicholas Edwards, MP for Pembrokeshire, held the post for eight years. On his departure, the government ceased to look within Wales for the secretary of state, and the post was increasingly used as a way of getting junior high-fliers into the Cabinet. John Redwood in particular caused embarrassment when he publicly demonstrated his inability to sing "Hen Wlad Fy Nhadau", the Welsh national anthem, at a conference.

The introduction of the National Assembly for Wales and the Welsh Government, after the devolution referendum of 1997, was the beginning of a new era. On 1 July 1999 the majority of the functions of the Welsh Office transferred to the new assembly. The Welsh Office was disbanded, but the post of Secretary of State for Wales was retained, as the head of the newly created Wales Office.

Since 1999 there have been calls for the office of Welsh secretary to be scrapped or merged with the posts of Secretary of State for Scotland and Secretary of State for Northern Ireland, to reflect the lesser powers of the role since devolution. Those calling for a Secretary of State for the Union include Robert Hazell, in a department into which Rodney Brazier has suggested adding a Minister of State for England with responsibility for English local government.

Ministers and secretaries of state
Colour key

Note

See also
 First Minister for Wales
 Secretary of State for Northern Ireland
 Secretary of State for Scotland

References

External links
Labour Party in Wales – covers the history of the post
Hain promoted in Brown's cabinet, BBC News Online, 28 June 2007
Hain takes work and pensions job, BBC News Online, 28 June 2007

Politics of Wales
Wales
Government of Wales
 
Ministerial offices in the United Kingdom
1964 establishments in the United Kingdom